Feltham may refer to:

Places
Feltham, Greater London, England – a town/district in the London Borough of Hounslow, bordering Surrey.
Feltham, Pitminster, Somerset, England – a hamlet.
Feltham (HM Prison), HM Prison Feltham, Feltham Young Offenders Institution.

Events
 Feltham Novices' Chase at Kempton Park (or "The Feltham").

People
 Aaron Feltham (born 1982), Canadian water polo player 
 Gerald A. Feltham (1938–2019), Canadian accounting researcher and educator
 Lex Feltham, Australian musician, former member of Frenzal Rhomb
 Louise Feltham (born 1935), Canadian House of Commons member
 Mark Feltham (disambiguation)
 Oliver Feltham, contemporary philosopher and English translator of Alain Badiou's work
 Owen Feltham (1602–1668), English writer
 Paul Feltham (born 1946), Australian sport psychologist, footballer, and coach
 Phill Feltham (born 1976), Canadian journalist

Historic uses
 Feltham (UK Parliament constituency) (defunct)
 Feltham Urban District (defunct)

Other
 Feltham tram, a tram car designed for London, England